Payment in kind may refer to:

 Barter, exchange of goods or services for other goods or services
 Payment in kind loan, a type of loan which typically does not provide for any cash flows from borrower to lender between the drawdown date and the maturity or refinancing date